Ade Bethune (January 12, 1914 – May 1, 2002) was an American Catholic liturgical artist.

She was associated with the Catholic Worker Movement, and designed an early masthead of its publication, the Catholic Worker, first used in 1935.  She later re-designed this in 1985, replacing one of the men with a woman.

Bethune was an advocate of traditional iconography.

She is buried at Portsmouth Abbey, Portsmouth, Rhode Island.

She was she was inducted into the Rhode Island Heritage Hall of Fame in 1990.

Early life
Born Baroness Adélaide de Bethune to a noble Belgian family, her parents were Gaston and Marthe Terlinden. She emigrated with the family after World War I. Her mother Marthe was daughter of Viscount Terlinden.

Career beginnings
She volunteered her illustrations to improve the quality of the Catholic Worker when she was a nineteen-year-old art student, impressed with the work of Dorothy Day.  This was preparation for her later illustration for Catholic liturgical works such as My Sunday Missal in 1937, and similar works such as My Lenten Missal.

De Bethune also worked closely with Graham Carey and with the Catholic Art Association, founded in 1937 by Sister Esther Newport.

Terra Sancta Guild
Beginning in the 1960s, she was the artistic director of the Terra Sancta Guild, a commercial firm that produced religious art works for many Christian denominations.

Social activism
Ade was interested in the Catholic Worker Movement's work with hospitality for the poor when she was an art student.  She continued this interest throughout her life, and became interested in the issue of providing housing for the elderly, particularly the poor elderly.  In 1969, she founded the Church Community Housing Corporation in Newport County, Rhode Island, to design and build housing.  In 1991 she founded Star of the Sea to renovate a former Carmelite convent into an intentional community and state of the art housing for the elderly, where she lived until her death in 2002.

Artistic works
 Crucifix, St. Paulinus Parish, Clairton, Pennsylvania
 Design of St. Leo Church in St. Paul, Minnesota, including revival of a central altar
 Altar chapel and stained glass oculus at the Chapel + Cultural Center at Rensselaer
 Mosaic wall of the Baptistery, Church of the Angry Christ, Victorias City, Philippines
 Mosaic murals and lacquer tabernacle in collaboration with the Czech architect Antonin Raymond, and Filipino American artist,  Alfonso Ossorio, Chapel of Saint Joseph the Worker, Negros Island, Philippines

Biography
 Judith Stoughton: Proud Donkey of Schaerbeek: Ade Bethune, Catholic Worker Artist St. Cloud, Minnesota, North Star Press of St. Cloud, 1988 
 On-line short biography
 James A. Merolla Where are they now? Ade Bethune, Catholic Worker artist
 Information from the Catholic Worker

Sources
 The Ade Bethune Collection
 The Long Loneliness: The Autobiography of Dorothy Day; illustrated by Fritz Eichenberg; introduction by Daniel Berrigan.

References

Cooper Union alumni
Catholic Workers
Belgian emigrants to the United States
American draughtsmen
Artists from Rhode Island
Roman Catholic activists
People from Schaerbeek
1914 births
2002 deaths
Burials in Rhode Island